Jean François Ondo (1916–1972) was the foreign minister of Gabon for a period in 1963. 

Ondo died in 1972 in Oyem. A foundation in his name was established in 1984.

References

External links
Mention of Jean François Ondo's death  

1916 births
1972 deaths
Foreign ministers of Gabon